FK Rudar may refer to:
FK Rudar Pljevlja, Montenegro
FK Rudar Kakanj, Bosnia and Herzegovina
FK Rudar Breza, Bosnia and Herzegovina
FK Rudar Ugljevik, Bosnia and Herzegovina
FK Rudar Prijedor, Bosnia and Herzegovina
FK Rudar Kostolac, Serbia
FK Rudar Bor, Serbia
FK Rudar Alpos, Serbia
FK Rudar Probištip, Republic of Macedonia